Ahlafors Bryggerier is a Swedish microbrewery located in Ale, Västra Götaland county. The beers can be found in a few restaurants and be bought through the order segment at Systembolaget (Västra Götaland County only). The alcohol by volume (ABV) range from 4.5% to 6.0%.

The brewery also produces two kinds of cider: Ahlafors Päroncider (pear cider) and Ahlafors Flädercider (elder cider).

The winning beers of the Swedish homebrewing championships between 2002-2005 were awarded to make one full-scale brewing at Ahlafors facilities:

 2002: Simple stout (a dry stout)
 2003: Macka (a Scottish ale)
 2004: Kåtisbock (an eisbock) 
 2005: Russki imponerande stout (an imperial stout)

Ahlafors Bryggerier offers guided tours and tastings at the brewery.

External links 
 Ahlafors Bryggerier

Breweries in Sweden
Food and drink companies established in 1996
Swedish brands
Companies based in Västra Götaland County
1996 establishments in Sweden